The 2020-21 Fordham Rams women's basketball team represents Fordham University during the 2020-21 NCAA Division I women's basketball season. The Rams are led by tenth-year head coach Stephanie Gaitley. They are members of the Atlantic 10 Conference and play their home games at the Rose Hill Gymnasium.

Schedule

|-
!colspan=9 style=| Non-conference regular season

|-
!colspan=9 style=| Atlantic 10 regular season

|-
!colspan=9 style=| Non-conference regular season

|-
!colspan=9 style=| Atlantic 10 regular season

|-
!colspan=9 style=| Non-conference regular season

|-
!colspan=9 style=| Atlantic 10 Tournament

|-
!colspan=9 style=|WNIT

|}

See Also 
 2020–21 Fordham Rams men's basketball team

References

Fordham
Fordham Rams women's basketball seasons
Fordham
Fordham